Two Worlds is a 2007 French comedy film directed by Daniel Cohen.

Cast
Benoît Poelvoorde as Rémy Bassano
Natacha Lindinger as Lucile
Michel Duchaussoy as Mutr van Kimé
Daniel Cohen as Rimé Kiel
Pascal Elso as Serge Vitali
Arly Jover as Delphine
Augustin Legrand as Kerté / Zotan
 as Bali
Zofia Moreno as Cara
Catherine Mouchet as La libraire
Florence Loiret Caille as Omi 
Stefano Accorsi as Antoine Geller
Audrey Fleurot as Boubs

References

External links

2007 comedy films
2007 films
French comedy films
2000s French films
2000s French-language films